= Gaultois Granite =

- Stratigraphic range: Late Silurian
- Type: Formation

Lithology
- Primary: Plutonic granite

Location
- Region: Newfoundland and Labrador
- Country: Canada
- Occurrence of the Gaultois Granite in southeastern Newfoundland

The Gaultois Granite is a formation cropping out in Newfoundland.
